Dutton is an unincorporated community in Gloucester County, Virginia, United States. Dutton has a post office with ZIP code 23050.

References

Unincorporated communities in Gloucester County, Virginia
Unincorporated communities in Virginia